Richmond Cavill "Dick" Eve (19 March 1901 – 13 March 1970) was an Australian diver who competed in the 1924 Summer Olympics. He won the gold medal in the plain high diving and finished fifth in the 3 metre springboard event. He was the first Australian Olympic diver to win a gold medal. His brother was Australian sports administrator Jim Eve.

See also
 List of members of the International Swimming Hall of Fame

References

External links
 Australian Dictionary of Biography entry

 Australian Olympic Committee Profile

1901 births
1970 deaths
Olympic divers of Australia
Divers at the 1924 Summer Olympics
Olympic gold medalists for Australia
Olympic medalists in diving
Australian male divers
Sport Australia Hall of Fame inductees
People from Manly, New South Wales
Medalists at the 1924 Summer Olympics
20th-century Australian people